Channel 52 refers to several television stations:

United States
The following low-power television stations, which are no longer licensed, formerly broadcast on analog channel 52:
 KCPL-LP in Rapid City, South Dakota

See also
 Channel 52 virtual TV stations in the United States

52